Erich Gröner (16 March 1901, in Berlin – 21 June 1965) was a German historian of naval warfare and shipbuilding.

Early life and education
Erich Gröner was born on 16 March 1901 in Berlin, then capital of the German Empire. From 1910 to 1918, he attended the  He published his first treatise, A History of Maritime Trade and Sea War Shipping, at 15 years of age. Gröner enlisted voluntarily into the Kaiserliche Marine in 1918.

Citations

Bibliography

1901 births
1965 deaths
Writers from Berlin
Imperial German Navy personnel of World War I
Reichsmarine personnel
German mechanical engineers
German opinion journalists
German naval historians
Engineers from Berlin